James Warren Jones (May 13, 1931 – November 18, 1978) was an American cult leader, political activist, preacher, and faith healer who between 1955 and 1978 led the Peoples Temple, a new religious movement. In what he described as "revolutionary suicide", Jones and his inner circle orchestrated a mass murder–suicide in his remote jungle commune at Jonestown, Guyana, on November 18, 1978. Jones and the events at Jonestown have had a defining influence on society's perception of cults.

Jones grew up in poverty and was neglected by his family as a young child and often cared for by neighbors. He developed many unusual behaviors as a youth and became increasingly disliked by his community. As a youth, Jones developed an affinity for Pentecostalism and desired to be a preacher. After the divorce of his parents, he and his mother moved to Richmond, Indiana where graduated high school. He was a good student and began to espouse radical political views after he began attending Indiana University. Jones took a job working as an orderly in a hospital where he met his future wife, Marceline. The couple married in 1949 before moving to Indianapolis where Jones continued his education at Butler University and became a member of the Communist Party and began his ministry.

Childhood poverty
James Warren Jones was born on May 13, 1931, in the rural community of Crete, Indiana, to James Thurman Jones and Lynetta Putnam. Jones went by the nickname Jimmy during his youth. Jones was of Irish and Welsh descent; he and his mother both claimed partial Cherokee ancestry, but there is no evidence of such ancestry.  Jones's father was a disabled World WarI veteran who suffered from severe breathing difficulties due to injuries he sustained in a chemical weapons attack. The military pension he received for his injuries was not sufficient to support his family, and he attempted to supplement his income by periodically working on local road repair projects.

The financial difficulties caused by his father's illness led to marital problems between Jones's parents. In 1934, in the midst of the Great Depression, the Jones family was evicted from their home for failure to make mortgage payments. Their relatives purchased a shack for them to live in at the nearby town of Lynn. The new home, where Jones grew up, lacked plumbing and electricity.  In Lynn, the family attempted to earn an income through farming, but again met with failure when Jones's father's health further deteriorated. The family often lacked adequate food and relied on financial support from their extended family. They sometimes resorted to foraging in the nearby forest and fields to supplement their diet.

According to multiple Jones biographers, his mother had "no natural maternal instincts" and frequently neglected her son. Her pregnancy was unwanted, and she expressed disappointment at becoming a mother and was often bitter and unhappy about their family's financial and social position.  When Jones began attending school, his extended family threatened to cut off their financial assistance unless his mother took a job, forcing her to work outside the home. Meanwhile, Jones's father was hospitalized multiple times due to his illness. As a result, Jones's parents were frequently absent during his childhood.

His aunts and uncles who lived nearby provided some supervision, but Jones often wandered the streets of the town (sometimes naked) with no one caring for him. Many women in Lynn felt sorry for Jones, and he was frequently invited into the homes of his neighbors who provided him with meals, clothing, and other gifts.

Early religious and political influences

Myrtle Kennedy, the wife of the pastor of the local Nazarene Church, developed a special attachment to Jones. Jones often stayed overnight in the Kennedys' home to be cared for.  Kennedy, known in the community for her religious zeal, took Jones to church multiple times a week. She gave Jones a Bible and encouraged him to study it and taught him to follow the holiness code of the Nazarene Church. Jones was able to quote Bible passages from an early age.

As Jones grew older, he attended services at most of the churches in Lynn, often going to multiple churches each week, and he was also baptized by several of them. Jones began to develop a desire to become a preacher as a youth and began to practice preaching in private. His mother claimed that she was disturbed when she caught him imitating the pastor of the local Apostolic Pentecostal Church and she unsuccessfully attempted to prevent him from attending the church's services. In his early teenage years, Jones spent several months evangelizing in his community on behalf of the local Pentecostal church.

Although they had sympathy for Jones because of his poor circumstances, his neighbors reported that he was an unusual child who was obsessed with religion and death. He regularly visited a casket manufacturer in Lynn and held mock funerals for roadkill that he collected. When he could not get any children to attend his funerals, he would perform the services alone. Jones claimed that he had been given special powers, including the ability to fly. To prove his powers to the other children, he once jumped from the roof of a building and fell, breaking his arm. Despite the fall, he continued to claim that he possessed special powers. One Jones biographer suggested that he developed his unusual interests because he found it difficult to make friends.

Although his strange religious practices stood out the most to his neighbors, they also reported that he misbehaved in more serious ways. He frequently stole candy from merchants in the town; his mother was required to pay for his thefts. Jones regularly used offensive profanity, commonly greeting his friends and neighbors by saying, "Good morning, you son of a bitch" or, "Hello, you dirty bastard". At times, he would put other children into life-threatening situations and tell them he was guided by the Angel of Death. In later years, Jones claimed that he performed numerous sacrilegious pranks at the churches he attended as a child. He claimed that he stole the Pentecostal pastor's Bible and put cow manure on Acts 2:38. He also claimed that at a Catholic church, he replaced the holy water with a cup of his own urine. Jones's mother beat him with a leather belt in order to punish his misbehavior.

When World War II broke out, Jones became enamored with Adolf Hitler and the Nazi Party. He was intrigued by their pageantry, their unity, and the absolute power wielded by Hitler. The people in his community found his idolization of Nazi Germany disturbing. Jones played dictator with the other children, forcing them to goosestep in unison and hitting the children who failed to obey his orders. One childhood acquaintance recalled that Jones gave the Nazi salute and shouted "Heil Hitler!" when he met German prisoners of war passing through their community en route to a detention facility.

Jones developed an intense interest in religion and social doctrines. He became a voracious reader who studied Hitler, Joseph Stalin, Karl Marx, Mao Zedong and Mahatma Gandhi. He spent hours in the community library, and he brought books home so he could read them in the evenings. Although he studied different political systems, Jones did not espouse any radical political views in his youth.

Commenting on his childhood, Jones stated, "I was ready to kill by the end of the third grade. I mean, I was so aggressive and hostile, I was ready to kill. Nobody gave me love, any understanding. In those days a parent was supposed to go with a child to school functions. There was some kind of school performance, and everybody's parent was there but mine. I'm standing there, alone. Always was alone." Tom Reiterman, a biographer of Jones, wrote that Jones's attraction to religion was strongly influenced by his desire for a family.

In 1942, the Kennedy family moved to Richmond, Indiana, for the summer and Jones visited them. They attended a summer religious convention at a nearby Pentecostal church, participating in services four times a week. When Jones returned to Lynn in the autumn, he offended his community by giving explicit explanations of sexual reproduction to young children. Many people in Lynn demanded that Jones' mother curtail his behavior, but she refused. The situation caused many parents to keep their children away from Jones. By the time he entered high school, he had become an outcast among his peers and was increasingly disliked by the members of his community.

Education and marriage

In high school, Jones continued to stand out from his peers. He enjoyed debating his teachers, and he was also a good student. He developed a habit of refusing to answer anyone who spoke to him first, he only spoke to people when he initiated conversations with them. Jones was known to wear his Sunday church attire every day of the week, while his peers dressed more casually. He almost always carried his bible with him. His religious views alienated other young people. He frequently confronted them for drinking beer, smoking, and dancing. At times, he would interrupt other young people's events and insist that they read the bible with him.

Jones disliked playing sports because he hated losing, so he served as coach on sports teams he organized with younger children. In 1945, Jones organized an entire league of teams for a summer baseball tournament. While he was attending a baseball game in Richmond, Jones was bothered by the treatment of African Americans who attended the game. The events at the ball game brought discrimination against African Americans to Jones's attention and influenced his strong aversion to racism. Jones's father was associated with the Indiana branch of the Ku Klux Klan, which was very popular in Depression-era Indiana. Jones recounted how he and his father argued about the issue of race, and he also stated that he did not speak to his father for "many, many years" after he refused to allow one of Jones's black friends to enter his house.

The unhappy marriage of Jones's parents came to an end when the couple finally separated in 1945 and eventually divorced. Jones relocated to Richmond with his mother, where he continued his high school education. Jones and his mother lost the financial support of their relatives following the divorce. To support himself, Jones began working as an orderly at Richmond's Reid Hospital in 1946. Jones was well-regarded by the senior management, but staff members later recalled that Jones exhibited disturbing behavior towards some patients and coworkers. Jones began dating a nurse-in-training named Marceline Baldwin while he was working at Reid Hospital.

In December 1948, Jones graduated from Richmond High School early with honors. He relocated to Bloomington, Indiana in November 1948, where he attended Indiana University Bloomington with the intention of becoming a doctor, but changed his mind shortly thereafter. During his time at University, Jones was impressed by a speech which Eleanor Roosevelt delivered about the plight of African-Americans, and he began to espouse support for communism and other radical political views for the first time.

Jones and Marceline Baldwin continued their relationship while he attended college, and the couple married on June 12, 1949. Their first home was in Bloomington, where Marceline worked in a nearby hospital while Jones attended college. Marceline was Methodist, and she and Jones immediately fell into arguments about church. Jones's strong opposition to the Methodist church's racial segregationist practices was an early on strain their marriage. Jones insisted on attending Bloomington's Full Gospel Tabernacle, but eventually compromised and began attending a local Methodist church on most Sunday mornings while attending Pentecostal churches Sunday evenings and weekdays.

Through the years, Jones's marriage relationship was affected by his insecurity. He often felt the need to test Marceline's love and loyalty, and at times he used sadistic methods to do so. One recurring tactic he used was to tell her that one of her close friends or family members had suddenly died, and then comfort her over the loss, before finally admitting to her the story was untrue.  In 1950, the couple unofficially adopted Marceline's nephew Ronnie, who moved into their home for four years.

After attending Indiana University for two years, the couple relocated to Indianapolis in 1951. Jones took night classes at Butler University to continue his education, finally earning a degree in secondary education in 1961—ten years after enrolling. In 1951, the 20-year-old Jones began attending gatherings of the Communist Party USA in Indianapolis.

Jones and his family faced harassment from government authorities for their affiliation with the Communist Party during 1952. In one event, Jones's mother was harassed by FBI agents in front of her co-workers because she had attended a communist meeting with her son. Jones also became frustrated with the persecution of communists in the U.S. Reflecting back on his participation in the Communist Party, Jones said that he asked himself, "How can I demonstrate my Marxism? The thought was, infiltrate the church."

Footnotes

References
 
 
 
 
 
 
 
 
 
 
 

Peoples Temple
Early lives by individual
History of Indiana